This is a list of major third party and independent tickets for President of the United States and Vice President of the United States.

Criteria
The presidential candidates are listed here based on three criteria:
They were not members of one of the six major parties in U.S. history: the Federalist Party, the Democratic-Republican Party, the National Republican Party, the Whig Party, the Democratic Party, and the Republican Party at the time of their candidacy. Independent candidates are included.
They either received at least one electoral vote from an elector who was not a faithless elector, or they received at least one percent of the national popular vote in an election held after the national popular vote began to be recorded in 1824.
They ran after the ratification of the Twelfth Amendment in 1804.

List of tickets

See also
List of people who received an electoral vote in the United States Electoral College
List of unsuccessful major party candidates for President of the United States

Notes

References

Works cited

 
 
 
 
 
 

Presidential elections in the United States
Lists of candidates for President of the United States
Third party (United States)